Dwight Mission is a census-designated place (CDP) in Sequoyah County, Oklahoma, United States. It is part of the Fort Smith, Arkansas-Oklahoma Metropolitan Statistical Area. The population was 55 at the 2010 census, a 71.9 percent gain over the figure of 32 recorded in 2000. It is currently the home of Dwight Mission Presbyterian Camp & Retreat Center.

History
(see Dwight Presbyterian Mission)

The original Dwight Mission was established in August 1820 on Illinois Bayou, near present-day Russellville, Arkansas, in the Cherokee settlements. It was named after Rev. Timothy Dwight, President of Yale University and an influential member of the American Board of Commissioners for Foreign Missions.

In 1828 the Western Cherokees were forced to move out of Arkansas into Indian Territory (present day Oklahoma). As a result of this move, Dwight Mission was reestablished on Sallisaw Creek, in Sequoyah County in the Marble City, Oklahoma area.

Dwight Mission reopened in Indian Territory on Sallisaw Creek on May 1, 1830. The mission consisted of twenty-one houses, a large dining hall, a barn, and outbuildings.

A series of parochial and tribal schools existed on the site until 1948 (with the exception of the Civil War years when the site was abandoned) and 1884–1886).

In 1950, Presbyterian Church USA purchased the property. Since that time, Dwight Mission has served as a church camp and retreat center.

Geography
Dwight Mission is located at  (35.557330, -94.850257).

Demographics

As of the census of 2000, there were 32 people, 12 households, and 8 families residing in the CDP. The population density was 17.6 people per square mile (6.8/km2). There were 13 housing units at an average density of 7.1/sq mi (2.8/km2). The racial makeup of the CDP was 68.75% White, 28.12% Native American, and 3.12% from two or more races.

There were 12 households, out of which 16.7% had children under the age of 18 living with them, 50.0% were married couples living together, 16.7% had a female householder with no husband present, and 33.3% were non-families. 25.0% of all households were made up of individuals, and 25.0% had someone living alone who was 65 years of age or older. The average household size was 2.67 and the average family size was 3.13.

In the CDP, the population was spread out, with 9.4% under the age of 18, 12.5% from 18 to 24, 28.1% from 25 to 44, 28.1% from 45 to 64, and 21.9% who were 65 years of age or older. The median age was 45 years. For every 100 females, there were 113.3 males. For every 100 females age 18 and over, there were 93.3 males.

The median income for a household in the CDP was $35,000, and the median income for a family was $29,000. Males had a median income of $18,750 versus $27,750 for females. The per capita income for the CDP was $15,170. None of the population and none of the families were below the poverty line.

See also
American Board of Commissioners for Foreign Missions
Daniel Sabin Butrick (Buttrick)
Brainerd Mission
Cherokee Nation
Mission (Christianity)
Samuel Worcester

References

Census-designated places in Oklahoma
Census-designated places in Sequoyah County, Oklahoma
Fort Smith metropolitan area